There are 36 listed buildings (Swedish: byggnadsminne) in Kronoberg County.

Alvesta Municipality

Lessebo Municipality

Ljungby Municipality

Markaryd Municipality
There are no listed buildings in Markaryd  Municipality.

Tingsryd Municipality

Uppvidinge Municipality

Växjö Municipality

Älmhult Municipality

External links

  Bebyggelseregistret

Listed buildings in Sweden